RJ Sigurdson  is a Canadian politician who was elected in the 2019 Alberta general election to represent the electoral district of Highwood in the 30th Alberta Legislature.

Policies
In February 2021, in an Okotoks Today article, Sigurdson said that he shared the concerns of his constituents regarding the June 2020 rescinding of the 1976 coal policy. Sigurdson supports "protecting the watershed of southern Alberta and the integrity of the eastern slopes of the Canadian Rockies."

In response to the Level 1 more stringent COVID-19 restrictions announced by Premier Jason Kenney on April 6, 2021, Sigurdson and 16 other UCP MLAs signed an open letter to the premier, calling on him to roll back the restrictions. All of the MLAs who cosigned the appeal represent ridings outside the two largest cities of Calgary and Edmonton.

Electoral History

References

United Conservative Party MLAs
Living people
21st-century Canadian politicians
Year of birth missing (living people)